Simon Muhr Work Training School is a historic school building located in the Nicetown–Tioga neighborhood of Philadelphia, Pennsylvania.  It was built in 1899, and is a three-story, three bay, stone building on a raised basement in the Gothic-style.  It features a central projecting bay with stepped gable and battlement-like motif.  It was named for Simon Muhr, who bequeathed money for public education in Philadelphia.

It was added to the National Register of Historic Places in 1986.

Longtime Philadelphia City Councilman at Large David Cohen (politician) was an alumnus of the school.

References

School buildings on the National Register of Historic Places in Philadelphia
Gothic Revival architecture in Pennsylvania
School buildings completed in 1899
Nicetown-Tioga, Philadelphia
1899 establishments in Pennsylvania